Brian Stanley (born January 1958) is an Irish Sinn Féin politician who has been a Teachta Dála (TD) for the Laois–Offaly constituency since the 2020 general election, and previously from 2011 to 2016 and from 2016 to 2020 for the Laois constituency. He was appointed Chair of the Public Accounts Committee in July 2020.

He unsuccessfully contested the 2002 and 2007 general elections in Laois-Offaly.

Stanley was elected at the 1999 local elections as a member of Portlaoise Town Council, and was re-elected in 2004, and in 2009. He was elected as a member of Laois County Council for the Portlaoise local electoral area at the 2004 local elections, and was re-elected in 2009. His wife, Caroline Dwane Stanley, is a member of Laois County Council.

In July 2020, Stanley was appointed as the chair of the Public Accounts Committee. He is the first Sinn Féin TD to hold the office.

In December 2020, Stanley became embroiled in controversies over a number of tweets, originating with a tweet that referenced the Narrow Water Ambush by the IRA in 1979. In response, Stanley offered apologies before deleting his Twitter account and asked for speaking time in Dáil Eireann to address the situation. Another tweet made by Stanley about Leo Varadkar was criticized by Micheál Martin, saying the tweet had an "inference of homophobia."

References

External links
Brian Stanley's page on the Sinn Féin website

1958 births
Living people
Local councillors in County Laois
Members of the 31st Dáil
Members of the 32nd Dáil
Politicians from County Laois
Sinn Féin TDs (post-1923)
Members of the 33rd Dáil